Implicit invocation is a term used by some authors for a style of software architecture in which a system is structured around event handling, using a form of callback. It is closely related to inversion of control and what is known informally as the Hollywood principle.

Implicit invocation is the core technique behind the observer pattern.

See also
 Spring Framework
 Qt Framework

References

External links
 An Introduction to Software Architecture by David Garlan and Mary Shaw
 An Introduction to Implicit Invocation Architectures by Benjamin Edwards

Software architecture